Colbert Rudzani Mukwevho (born 26 October 1965) is a South African reggae musician and producer.
 Mukwevho was granted an honorary doctorate of Philosophy  in Arts  and Social Sciences by the University of Venda. This is how he came to be called Dr. Mukwevho.

Life
Mukwevho was born in South Africa, Limpopo province, in 1965.He moved from the former homeland of Gazankulu to the  Venda region under the Group Areas Act which was introduced by the Apartheid  Government.

His wife, Ms Juliah Mukwevho, died at Siloam Hospital after a short illness in 2020, where the Executive Mayor of Vhembe District Municipality, Cllr Dowelani Nenguda paid a visit to the family after hearing the news.

Music career

Mukwevho started his music  career in 1975 by joining the family band, "The Thrilling Artists"  at a tender age of 10. The band was formed by his father and uncle, where he joined as a backing singer and later was a bass player and lead singer. Most of Mukwevho's songs are sang in Tshivenda but some are sang in  Xitsonga or English. He has managed to record and produce close to 200 songs and has recorded close to 20 albums.

Mukwevho recorded "Mukhada O Ntshuma" and "Hani-Hani" albums with "The Thrilling Artists" under Gallo Record Company, at the time  he was just providing vocal harmony and playing the bass guitar. One year later a third album titled "Ha Nga Dzuli" which had reggae songs was released.

Mukwevho and his family departed "The Thrilling Artists" band in 1983 to form a new group called "The Comforters" which was led by Mukwevho himself. They recorded some songs  with Radio Venda  (now called  "Phalaphala FM"), but the songs were not for sale. Mukwevho also worked with artists like Sello Chicco Twala and Brenda Fassie in the late 1980s.     
 
Mukwevho worked with Jamaican producers such as Robbie Shakespeare and Sly Dunbar to record one of his albums in Jamaica. The album was followed by "The Lord is my Rock", which was awarded Best Reggae Album by South Africa Music Awards. He has also written and produced albums with the South African branch of EMI  "CCP" .

Discography

Albums
Lion in the sheep skin(1990)
I do nela rothe(1993)
Harley and rasta family(1995)
The lord is my rock(1997)
Why?(1999)
Doomsday(2001)
Mulovha namusi na matshelo(2004)
Mmbwa i do la mmbwa(2008)
Lion & son o'lion(2013)
Dooms day(2015)
Best of Dr. mukwevho(2021)

References

South African reggae musicians
People from Limpopo
1965 births
Living people